Donald E. Parker is an American experimental psychologist and academic. He is Professor Emeritus at Miami University in Ohio and an affiliate professor at the University of Washington.

Biography
Parker graduated with a Ph.D. in experimental psychology from Princeton University. He is a professor at the Human Interface Technology (HIT) Lab and in the Otolaryngology–Head and Neck Surgery Department at the University of Washington. He is a Professor Emeritus at Miami University in Ohio and is still a member of the Barany Society, which he joined in 1980.

References

Living people
20th-century births
21st-century American psychologists
Year of birth missing (living people)
Princeton University alumni